, formerly known as , was a Japanese video game development company founded in 1986. The company was renamed in 2003 when Telenet Japan sold part of its stake and made Namco the majority shareholder. Namco Tales Studio was originally the primary developer of the Tales RPG series, as it had been since the series' beginning. In November 2011, it was announced that the current Tales Studio would be dissolved and would merge with their publisher, Namco Bandai Games. In February 2012, it was announced that the 80 people of the Tales team would join Bandai Namco Studios.

History
Originally headed by Masahiro Akishino, Wolf Team became independent from Telenet in 1987, was reintegrated in 1990 and got merged with another Telenet subsidiary called Lasersoft, then was completely absorbed in an internal restructuring at Telenet in 1993 at which point most of the staff left together with Akishino.

The remaining staff were the then-very-young programmer Yoshiharu Gotanda, designer Masaki Norimoto, director Joe Asanuma, graphic artist Yoshiaki Inagaki, sound composer Motoi Sakuraba, and sound effect designer Ryota Furuya. Wolf Team went on to create games such as Sol-Feace and Hiouden: Mamono-tachi tono Chikai, which faced weak sales. They were also notable for porting laserdisc video games to the Sega Mega-CD, including some Japan-only arcades like Time Gal and Ninja Hayate (released as Revenge of the Ninja for the Sega Mega-CD outside Japan).

For Tale Phantasia, a game concept by Gotanda, they looked for an outside publisher with a better reputation. After approaching Enix, Telenet struck a contract with Namco. Namco insisted on many changes to the game, including changing the title to Tales of Phantasia. The conflict over these changes pushed the game's release from 1994 into late 1995. Most of the initial staff left during this dispute and founded tri-Ace in early 1995.

To continue the lucrative arrangement with Namco to develop the Tales series, Telenet re-staffed Wolf Team and retained some other staff, such as Motoi Sakuraba on a freelance basis. Wolf Team dedicated itself to the series, developing or co-developing nearly every game. In 2003, Namco assumed majority ownership of the company and renamed it Namco Tales Studio.

At the time of its renaming Namco owned 60% of this venture, Telenet Japan/Kazuyuki Fukushima retained 34%, and Tales series director Eiji Kikuchi received 6%. (Kikuchi, who was the head of Telenet's game development department for 10 years, left Telenet to head the new team full-time.) Effective on April 1, 2006, the then-newly merged Bandai Namco Holdings bought the remaining shares from Telenet Japan, cutting the last link to the developers' former employer and increasing its stockholding majority to 94%. In October 2007, Telenet filed for bankruptcy and closed, putting an end to the Wolf Team name. Namco later acquired the remaining shares.

Namco Tales Studios remained the primary developer of the so-called "mothership" titles of the Tales series, with the exception of Tales of Legendia and Tales of Innocence. Legendia was developed by an internal Namco development team called Team Melfes; while Innocence was developed by an independent developer, Alfa System, which also developed various spinoff games in the Tales series.

In November 2011, it was announced that the current Tales Studio would be dissolved and would merge with their publisher, Namco Bandai Games. In February 2012, it was announced that the 80 people of the Tales team would join Bandai Namco Studios.

Developed games
Namco Tales Studio has developed games for the Nintendo GameCube, PlayStation, Game Boy Advance, PlayStation 2, PlayStation Portable, Nintendo DS, Nintendo 3DS, Wii, Xbox 360, and PlayStation 3.

Notes:
 Tales Studio sound staff only

For a complete list of Tales of games, see Tales (video game series).

As Wolf Team
Aisle Lord
Anett Futatabi
Arcus
Arcus II: Silent Symphony
Arcus 3
Arcus Odyssey
Akushu: Kagerou no Jidai wo Koe te
Apros: Daichi no Shou Kaze no Tankyuu Sha hen
Cliff Hanger
Cobra Command
Crystal Chaser: Tenkuu no Masuishou
D: European Mirage
Daitoua Mokujiroku Goh
Diamond Players
Devastator
Dino Land
Earnest Evans
El Viento
Fhey Area
Final Zone (FZ Senki AXIS)
Gaudi: Barcelona no Kaze
Granada
Goh 2
Gulf War Soukouden
Hiōden
Hiōden 2
Hiōden: Mamono-tachi tono Chikai
Jinmu Denshou
Mid-Garts
Neugier: Umi to Kaze no Kodō
Niko^2
Revenge of the Ninja
Road Blaster
Ryū: Naki no Ryū Yori
Seirei Shinseiki - Fhey Area
Shinsengumi: Bakumatsu Genshikou
Sol-Feace/Sol-Deace
Span of Dream
Suzaku
Tales of Destiny
Tales of Destiny 2
Tales of Eternia
Tales of Phantasia
Tales of Phantasia: Narikiri Dungeon
Tales of the World: Narikiri Dungeon 2
Tenbu Limited / Mankan Zenseki
Tenbu: Sangokushi Seishi
The Grail Hunter
Tokyo Twilight Busters
Time Gal
Valis: The Fantasm Soldier
Yaksa
Zan: Kagerou no Toki
Zan: Yasha Enbukyoku
Zan II: Spirits
Zan 2: Kagerou no Jidai
Zan 2: Kagerou no Jidai Soshuhen
Zan 3: Tenun Ware ni Ari
Zan Gear

Notes

References

External links

Former Bandai Namco Holdings subsidiaries
Defunct video game companies of Japan
Video game companies established in 1986
Video game companies disestablished in 2012
Video game development companies
Wolf Team games
2012 disestablishments in Japan
Japanese companies disestablished in 2012
Japanese companies established in 1986